George Gibb may refer to:

 George Gibb (transport administrator) (1850–1925), Scottish transport administrator
 George Gibb (footballer) (1891–1917), Scottish footballer
 George Duncan Gibb (1821–1876), Canadian physician and author; see Laryngology

Also see
 George Gibbs (disambiguation)